Skiippagurra is a village in Deatnu-Tana Municipality in Troms og Finnmark county, Norway. According to Statistics Norway, the village had 254 residents in 2008. Since 2003, Skiippagurra has also been home to an annual festival bearing its name. Skiippagurra is a trading place in Tana municipality, Troms and Finnmark county. The trading post is located on the east side of Deatnu (Tana river), four kilometers south of Deanu šaldi (Tana bridge).

Skiippagurra is the end point for river traffic on the Tana River to Karasjok. E6 and E75 pass the place, which has 254 inhabitants (2008). From here, highway 895 leads southwest to Buolbmát (Polmak). Skiippagurra has a Norwegian road museum, and is a checkpoint during the Finnmark race.

References

Villages in Finnmark
Populated places of Arctic Norway
Tana, Norway